Somethin' 'Bout Kreay is the debut studio album by American rapper Kreayshawn, released for digital download on September 14, 2012 and as a Hot Topic-exclusive CD under Columbia Records in the United States. It was released on CD elsewhere on September 25, 2012. The album features guest appearances from Chippy Nonstop, V-Nasty, Diplo, Sissy Nobby, Kid Cudi and 2 Chainz, while the production was handled mainly by Free School, Jonas Jeberg and DJ Two Stacks, among others.

Critics were divided in their reviews of Somethin' 'Bout Kreay. Several of the tracks received positive reviews, most notably "Gucci Gucci", but most of the other songs were panned by critics.

Critical reception

Critics were divided in their opinions of Somethin' Bout Kreay. At Metacritic, which assigns a weighted average rating out of 100 to reviews from mainstream critics, the album received an average score of 42, based on 14 reviews, which indicates "mixed or average reviews". Uncut gave the album a score of 6 out of 10 rating, stating, "Thanks to her Valley Girl charisma and omnivorous sexual gaze she mostly succeeds." On a similar note, Rolling Stone gave Somethin' Bout Kreay a positive review, with the album receiving 3 of 5 stars rating and furthermore telling "The Oakland MC's debut explores her skill at giving hormonally bonkers post-Odd Future shock rap a bratty, ashtray-Madonna spin." "Blasé Blasé", "Breakfast (Syrup)", "Gucci Gucci", "Left Ey3" have generally been well received, the other tracks have been criticized or completely panned by critics.

In a negative review, Carrie Battan of Pitchfork rated the album only 3 out of 10 points and explained "Somethin' Bout Kreay could very well be her first and last." At large, the production for Somethin' Bout Kreay was praised. While the fun factor on the record was commended, the lyrics were generally criticized. NME gave the album 5 of 10 stars rating, saying "Over 13 tracks, though, Kreay's 'thing' wears waaay thin." A negative review came from Under The Radar who gave the album a score of 2 out of 10, and said "It's a pop album of awful pop music." Random Independent listed Somethin' 'Bout Kreay in its 'best albums of 2012 list' as a 'special mention', without a concrete place.

Commercial performance
Somethin' 'Bout Kreay debuted at number 112 on the Billboard 200 in its first week of release, selling 3,502 copies. On January 16, 2014, Kreayshawn tweeted a screenshot of her portion of profit off of the album, the total profit made by Kreayshawn was $0.01.

Track listing
Track listing confirmed on Amazon. Writing and production credits taken from the album booklet.

Charts

References

2012 debut albums
Albums produced by Diplo
Albums produced by Free School
Columbia Records albums
Albums produced by Kid Cudi